Andrew Greenwell (born September 3, 1983) is an American real estate broker and reality television personality. He was a cast member on Bravo's Million Dollar Listing San Francisco.

Real estate career
Greenwell earned his real estate license as a 19-year-old college freshman. In 2007, he was named one of Realtor Magazine's "Top 30 Realtors in America Under 30."

Greenwell relocated to the San Francisco Bay Area in 2011. He currently serves as CEO and principal of Venture Sotheby's International Realty in Pleasanton.

In 2019, Greenwell acquired  Sotheby’s International Realty operations on the Big Island of Hawaii.

Million Dollar Listing San Francisco
In April 2015, Greenwell was announced as a cast member on the inaugural season of Million Dollar Listing San Francisco.

References

1983 births
Living people
American real estate businesspeople
American LGBT businesspeople
LGBT people from Florida
People from Sarasota, Florida
21st-century LGBT people
Television personalities from Florida